Sugar and Spies is a 1966 Warner Bros. Looney Tunes cartoon. The short was released on November 5, 1966, and stars Wile E. Coyote and the Road Runner. It is the second of two Road Runner shorts directed by Robert McKimson and the only one to feature music by Walter Greene. It is also the final appearance of the Road Runner and Wile E. Coyote during the Golden age of American animation.

The title of the cartoon is a play on the term "sugar and spice".

Summary
During one of his many chases with the Road Runner, Wile E. Coyote is hit with a briefcase, thrown from an enemy agent's car that is evading the police. The briefcase is actually a spy kit containing several gadgets, along with a black coat and spy hat that Wile E. wears throughout the cartoon. The gadgets Wile E. attempts on the Road Runner (which all result in failure as usual), include:
 Sleeping gas: Road Runner dodges the gas and blows it back at Wile E., who sleepwalks off a cliff.
 Do-it-yourself time bomb that Wile E. mails to the Road Runner (by General Delivery), but is returned to the Coyote by Road Runner (disguised as a mailman) for insufficient postage. As Wile E. takes the package back into his cave for an extra stamp . . . BOOM!!!
 Explosive putty which is applied under a huge boulder with a mound of bird seed placed nearby. Wile E. hides behind another boulder farther away and lights the fuse, only to be crushed by the launched boulder.
Model T jalopy  Spy car equipped with machine guns, ejection seat and cannon: The bullets from the machine guns ricochet off a boulder and blow away the car top, the Coyote ejects himself from the car while suspended upside down and the force from the cannon sends the car backwards, running over the Coyote who then fails to dodge the cannonball.
 Remote control flying bombs: Wile E. tests the first bomb on a cactus, then sets the remote control for the next bomb to follow Road Runner, who hides under the Coyote's stool and escapes in time for Wile E. to take the explosion. When the smoke clears, the dazed Coyote has the bomb's wings attached to his arms, prompting the Road Runner to set the remote control for the moon. As Wile E. is sent flying away, the Road Runner triumphantly beeps and runs off the screen, leaving a trail of smoke that spells out the words "The End".

Trivia
 The Spy car gag is a spoof of James Bond's Aston Martin gadget spy car.
 When the Coyote first ejects and gets knocked high in the air, he drifts back to his driver's seat in a spoof of Hertz car rental commercials.
 This is one of the few Golden Era shorts in which other characters besides the Coyote and the Road Runner are seen in the desert, and the only one other than The Wild Chase to show any humans (namely, the officers pursuing the oddly green-skinned spy, both in automobiles, at the beginning of the picture).

Home media
The cartoon was included in the Supergenius Hijinks DVD.

References

External links
 

1966 animated films
1966 short films
Looney Tunes shorts
Warner Bros. Cartoons animated short films
Wile E. Coyote and the Road Runner films
Films directed by Robert McKimson
1960s Warner Bros. animated short films
American animated short films
DePatie–Freleng Enterprises short films
Films about Canis
Animated films about mammals
Animated films about birds
American comedy short films
1960s spy comedy films
American spy comedy films